Pariana is a genus of tropical American plants in the grass family.

 Species

 formerly included
see Eremitis Steyermarkochloa 
 Pariana angustifolia - Steyermarkochloa angustifolia 
 Pariana microstachya - Eremitis parviflora 
 Pariana monothalamia - Eremitis parviflora 
 Pariana parviflora - Eremitis parviflora

References

External links
 Grassbase - The World Online Grass Flora

Bambusoideae genera
Bambusoideae